Timothy Filiga Cahill  (born 6 December 1979) is an Australian former professional footballer who played as an attacking midfielder but also played as a striker on many occasions. A box-to-box midfielder, Cahill became recognised for "his aggressive and powerful approach and his ability to head the ball in the penalty area". Cahill has scored 50 goals in 108 caps between 2004 and 2018 and is regarded as one of the greatest Australian footballers of all time. He currently works as a pundit for BBC Sport and Sky Sports.

In 1997, Cahill left Sydney for England to play professionally; there he was signed by Millwall on a free transfer from Sydney United. He was part of the Millwall side that won the Football League Second Division title in the 2000–01 season, and was also central part of Millwall's run to the 2004 FA Cup Final. Before the start of the 2004–05 season, Cahill was transferred to Everton. He was named both Everton Player of the Season and Everton Players' Player of the Season in his debut season, and in the following year he was named as one of 50 nominees for the Ballon d'Or, becoming the first Everton player in 11 years to be nominated. He was also part of the Everton side that reached the final of the 2008–09 FA Cup. Since leaving Everton in 2012, Cahill has played for the New York Red Bulls, Shanghai Shenhua, Hangzhou Greentown and Melbourne City. After a brief spell at former club Millwall, he ended his career at Jamshedpur.

Cahill was the first Australian to score at a FIFA World Cup, scored in three World Cups (2006, 2010, 2014) and has scored the most goals by any Australian in the World Cup with five goals. In 2007, he became the first Australian player to score at an AFC Asian Cup. Cahill is known for his adept heading ability and high vertical leap, having scored many of his goals with his head. He is famous for his regular goal celebration of shadow boxing around the corner flag.

Early life
Cahill was born in Sydney to an English-born father of Irish descent and a Samoan mother. He was encouraged to play football as a child, although he grew up in a rugby league-playing family. In his youth, Cahill played football for the Balmain Police Boys Club, Marrickville Football Club, and Plumpton/Oakhurst Soccer Club. He attended Bexley North Public School, Annandale North Public School, Tempe High School, Kingsgrove High School and Kingsgrove North High School.

He is the brother of retired-footballer and former Samoa captain, Chris Cahill. Many of his relatives are involved in rugby League: three cousins who are professional rugby League players, Ben Roberts (New Zealand Rugby League), Joe Stanley, and Jeremy Stanley (New Zealand Rugby Union); two nephews who are professional rugby league players, Chase Stanley and Kyle Stanley; and is related to Rugby Union professionals Sam Stanley (Saracens & England U20), Mike Stanley (Samoa), Benson Stanley, and Winston Stanley.

Club career

Millwall
In 1997, Cahill asked his parents to allow him to travel to England to play professionally; they allowed him to do so. He lived in Grays, Essex with family until he was signed by Millwall on a free transfer from Sydney United. He made his Millwall debut on 2 May 1998 against AFC Bournemouth at The Den, which Millwall lost 2–1. Cahill helped Millwall reach the 1999 Football League Trophy Final where they lost to Wigan Athletic.

He was part of the Millwall side that won the Football League Second Division championship with a club record 93 points in the 2000–01 season. He also reached two play-off semi-finals with Millwall in 2000 and 2002. Cahill was a central part of Millwall's run to the 2004 FA Cup Final, their first appearance in the showpiece in club history, scoring the winning goal in the semi-final against Sunderland, and securing a UEFA Cup place in the process. Cahill polled over 100,000 votes to win the FA Cup "Player of the Round" award for his performance during the semi-final victory. His last game for the club was against Manchester United in the final, which Millwall lost 3–0. Cahill made 249 overall appearances for The Lions, scoring 56 goals in the process.

Everton

Before the start of the 2004–05 season, Cahill was transferred to Everton for a fee of £1.5 million, after Millwall's South East London rivals Crystal Palace ended negotiations of a potential transfer to themselves over a payment to his agents. In his first season, he was Everton's top goalscorer and was the fans' Player of the Season. Before the 2005–06 season Cahill's contract at Everton was extended with a salary increase reflecting the impact he had made at the club. The third round of that season's FA Cup drew Cahill's former club, Millwall against Everton at The Den. He scored the winner in the replay at Goodison Park, but chose not to celebrate his winning goal, stating, "I decided not to go mad and just pay my respects to the club that gave me my start in the game. To celebrate would have been a kick in the teeth, it is all about respect."

In October 2006, Cahill was named as one of 50 nominees for the Ballon d'Or, becoming the first Everton player in 18 years to be nominated, and the only player on the list from an AFC nation. He missed much of the 2006–07 season with injuries to his knee and foot, but signed a five-year contract extension at the season's end.

Cahill returned from injury partway through the 2007–08 season in the club's first UEFA Cup Group match, a home match against Greek side Larissa on 25 October 2007, scoring from a diving header after 14 minutes in a 3–1 win. His extra time winner against Luton Town on 31 October in the League Cup, sent Everton into their first cup quarter-final in more than 5 years. His 100th league appearance for Everton came in a 1–1 draw against Sunderland. Due to injuries to all four of Everton's senior strikers Cahill was employed as a makeshift forward during December 2008. In this role he scored a late equaliser in the Merseyside Derby, becoming the first player since Dixie Dean to score for Everton in three Anfield derbies. His 100th career goal was scored against Arsenal at Goodison on 28 January 2009.

On 15 February, Cahill scored the third goal in a 3–1 win over Aston Villa and dedicated the goal to the victims of the 2009 Victorian bushfires. During the second half of the 2008–09 season, Cahill was used more as the "utility man" due to his versatility as Everton was plagued by injuries to playmaker Mikel Arteta as well as strikers Victor Anichebe and Yakubu and some other key players.

Owing to Phil Neville sustaining a knee ligament injury early in the 2009–10 season, Cahill was named as the replacement captain of Everton. Later in the season he scored his 50th goal for Everton, in a 3–1 victory over Carlisle United in the Third Round of the FA Cup.

Everton fans gave him the nickname "Tiny Tim" after the Charles Dickens character because he is slightly short and slim. He has made a corner flag goal celebration his "trademark". The celebration, where Cahill pretends to trade punches with the corner flag while putting the Everton badge between his teeth, was first seen in the 2005–06 season. On 2 March 2008, Cahill controversially celebrated his goal in the 3–1 home victory of Portsmouth by crossing his wrists as if he had been handcuffed. This was in reference to the recent jailing of his brother, Sean; Cahill later apologised for the gesture. Cahill dedicated his winning goal in a Europa League game against BATE Borisov to the victims of the earthquake and tsunami in Samoa, miming rowing a canoe after scoring in the second half of the match in Belarus.

Cahill scored two goals against Aston Villa on 14 April 2010, both coming from headers to move his goal tally for the season to nine goals, all coming from his head. Three days later against Blackburn Rovers, Cahill scored a 90th-minute winner, to give Everton a 3–2 victory.

Cahill made his 200th appearance for Everton on 25 April 2010 in a 2–1 against Fulham, and signed a new four-year contract the following month. He scored his fifth goal in a Merseyside derby, in a 2–0 win over Liverpool in October 2010, and his 50th Premier League goal a month later, in a game against Blackpool. The Aussie received a foot injury during the 2011 Asia Cup finals which limited his appearances until the end of the season to only nine – eight league games and one in the FA Cup.

Following his participation in the 2011 Asian Cup, Cahill had the longest goal drought in his career. He scored his last league goal in December 2010 away to Manchester City and went the whole of 2011 without finding the net. The run stretched to 34 games, but was finally ended when he scored the opening goal, a tap in from close range, in a 1–1 draw with Blackburn in January 2012.

On 13 May 2012, during Everton's last match against Newcastle United at Goodison Park, Cahill was sent off for violent conduct after the full-time whistle for an altercation with Yohan Cabaye. After eight years with Everton, Cahill thanked the club and fans saying, "I want to thank everyone at Everton, from the club to tremendous supporters. It has been a privilege to be an Everton player for the past eight years and it was a very difficult decision to leave. I will always support Everton and I wish the club the best of luck in the future."

New York Red Bulls

On 26 July 2012, Cahill signed for the New York Red Bulls of Major League Soccer as a Designated Player, for a fee reported to be approximately £1 million. He made his MLS debut in a game against the Houston Dynamo the following month. On 19 May 2013 Cahill scored a goal which turned out to be the winner in the 91st minute against the Los Angeles Galaxy in a 1–0 win.
On 20 October 2013, Cahill set a new record (broken in 2015 by Mike Grella) for the fastest goal in MLS history when he scored eight seconds into a 3–0 win against the Houston Dynamo. Cahill replaced suspended forward Bradley Wright-Phillips in the second leg of the Red Bulls' MLS Cup semi-final against the New England Revolution on 29 November 2014. Despite Cahill opening the scoring in the 26th minute to level the tie, the Red Bulls bowed out with a 2–2 draw in Massachusetts, losing 4–3 on aggregate. On 2 February 2015, Cahill left New York Red Bulls by mutual agreement.

Shanghai Shenhua
Following his departure from New York Red Bulls, Cahill signed with Chinese club Shanghai Shenhua. On 9 March 2015, Cahill debuted for Shanghai Shenhua in the team's opening game of the 2015 Chinese Super League season, a 6–2 win over rivals Shanghai Shenxin. Shanghai Shenhua also went to the Chinese FA Cup final in which they were defeated by Jiangsu Guoxin-Sainty after extra time.

On 16 February 2016, Cahill announced on social media that he had terminated his contract with Shanghai by mutual agreement upon being told that he was not part of new coach Gregorio Manzano's plans for the 2016 Chinese Super League season.

Hangzhou Greentown
On 22 February 2016, it was reported that Cahill signed with Chinese Super League club Hangzhou Greentown. On 6 March 2016, Cahill scored a penalty on his Hangzhou Greentown debut in a 2–1 win against Changchun Yatai. Cahill decided to come back to Australia for his family in the summer of 2016. On 14 July 2016, he had his contract terminated by mutual consent.

Melbourne City
On 11 August 2016, Cahill signed a three-year contract with A-League club Melbourne City, with the plan to play the first two years and then take on a coaching role for the third year. Cahill made his debut in the FFA Cup on 24 August as a 64th-minute substitute against Brisbane Strikers. In his second game for Melbourne City, he scored and got an assist in a 4–1 win in the FFA Cup quarter final against Western Sydney Wanderers. Cahill made his A-League debut in a Melbourne Derby against Melbourne Victory on 15 October. He opened the scoring with a spectacular volley into the top corner from 35 metres out after 27 minutes. City won the match 4–1. On 30 November, Cahill scored a trademark header in the FFA Cup Final. The victory over Sydney FC was the club's first piece of silverware.

On 4 February 2017, just as he was preparing to come on as a substitute against Melbourne Victory FC, Cahill was sent off for using "insulting, offensive, abusive language towards a match official" after he angrily disputed a goal with Chris Beath. This is the first time in Australian football history in which a player was sent off before entering the field of play.

On 6 December 2017, Cahill left Melbourne City after not getting enough game time, in a bid for more game time at club level to boost his chances to get selected for the Australian squad for the 2018 FIFA World Cup.

Return to Millwall
On 29 January 2018, Cahill rejoined his first professional club, Millwall, signing until the end of the 2017–18 EFL Championship season. A week after his return, he played for Millwall's under-23 team in the Professional Development League scoring a goal in their 3–2 victory over Coventry City. The following week, Cahill made his second Millwall debut, coming on in the 90th minute to a standing ovation.

He was released by Millwall at the end of the 2017–18 season.  Cahill’s ten appearances during this spell meant he retired having played one more league game for Millwall than Everton.

Jamshedpur FC
On 1 September 2018, Cahill signed with Indian Super League club Jamshedpur. However, he could not make his debut in the first game of the season against Mumbai City FC due to suspension in the game. He made his debut for the club in the next match, a 2–2 draw against Bengaluru. He scored his first goal for the club in a draw with Kerala Blasters, and later scored in a 2–1 win over Odisha. During February 2019, he was sidelined with a finger injury, and missed the rest of the season.

On 28 March 2019, Cahill announced his retirement from football.

International career

Western Samoa

Although born in Sydney, Cahill had lived in Western Samoa for three years before returning to Australia as a child. The Football Federation Samoa invited Australia-based Cahill to play for the country at the 1994 OFC U-20 Championship. The competition winners would qualify for the 1995 FIFA World Youth Championship. Cahill made his debut for the under-20 team at the age of 14.

He made his debut for Western Samoa in a 3–0 loss against New Zealand coming on as a substitute. He also played against Vanuatu in another 3–0 defeat. He played alongside his older brother Sean, who was a goalkeeper. His younger brother Chris later went on to captain the country at the top national team level.

Change of allegiance
In February 2002, Cahill received an offer to play for the Republic of Ireland at the 2002 FIFA World Cup by Mick McCarthy, his former manager at Millwall. Cahill has Irish grandparents and McCarthy had hoped that Cahill would be interested. However Cahill was not eligible as he was cap-tied to Samoa.

FIFA changed its eligibility rules in 2003, allowing players capped at junior levels to switch international allegiance, meaning that Cahill was then able to play for England, Republic of Ireland, Australia or Samoa. He chose to represent the country of his birth, declaring it a "special moment".

Australia

Cahill made his debut for Australia in a friendly against South Africa on 30 March 2004 at Loftus Road, London. He then participated at the 2004 Olympic Games.

2004 OFC Nations Cup
Cahill made his competitive debut for Australia at the 2004 OFC Nations Cup. Cahill finished the competition as second-highest scorer in the competition with six goals, and was the top scorer in the final round. Australia went on to win the competition for the fourth time in their history. Having won the competition, Australia were drawn against Uruguay in the World Cup qualification play-off. Cahill played in the game as Australia beat Uruguay after a penalty shoot out to qualify for the World Cup for the first time in over 30 years.

2004 Summer Olympics
Cahill helped Australia reach the quarter final stage of the men's football tournament at the 2004 Summer Olympics. He scored his only goal of the competition in a 5–1 win over Serbia. Australia were knocked out of the competition by Iraq following a 1–0 loss. Following his performances in the OFC Nations Cup and Summer Olympics competitions Cahill was named Oceania Footballer of the Year for 2004.

2005 FIFA Confederations Cup
Frank Farina named Cahill in his squad for the 2005 FIFA Confederations Cup. However the tournament was not a success for the Socceroos as they were eliminated at the group stage in a group that contained Argentina, Germany and Tunisia. Cahill played in all three games of Socceroos campaign.

2006 FIFA World Cup
Cahill played in the 2006 FIFA World Cup and, in Australia's opening group game against Japan, became the first ever Australian to score a World Cup goal. Scoring a second goal in the same game, he earned man of the match honours.

Cahill also played in the group game against Brazil, which Australia lost and a drawn group game against Croatia. Cahill played the entire "round of 16" match against eventual World Cup winners Italy, which Australia lost 0–1.

2007 Asian Cup
Cahill was on the Australian team which reached the quarter finals of the 2007 AFC Asian Cup. As he was recovering from injury, Cahill was used as a substitute throughout the tournament.

2010 FIFA World Cup
Cahill was instrumental in Australia's qualification for the 2010 FIFA World Cup, scoring goals in crucial matches against Qatar and Japan. At this time, former Australian coach Rale Rasic described Cahill as the best Australian footballer he had seen in his lifetime.

Despite earlier injury concerns, Cahill played in Australia's opening group game at the 2010 FIFA World Cup against Germany where he controversially received a straight red card in the 56th minute, which meant he missed the group match against Ghana in Rustenburg.

Cahill played in the final group match against Serbia, where he scored in the 69th minute. After the tournament, Cahill had scored a total of three FIFA World Cup goals, which is a national record.

2011 Asian Cup
Cahill was named to the 23-man squad for the 2011 Asian Cup campaign. The Socceroos made a bright start to the tournament by beating India 4–0, with Cahill scoring twice.

The final was played between Japan and Australia which resulted in a 1–0 loss from a 109th minute volley by Tadanari Lee.

2014 FIFA World Cup

Cahill scored three goals during the 2014 World Cup qualifying campaign as Australia reached a third consecutive finals.

On 5 March 2014, in a pre-World Cup friendly match against Ecuador, Cahill became Australia's all-time top goalscorer with 31 goals, scoring twice in a 4–3 loss.

Cahill scored Australia's only goal in their opening group match against Chile on 13 June 2014. He joined Portuguese star Cristiano Ronaldo, Mexican defender Rafael Márquez, Dutch players Robin van Persie and Arjen Robben, German player Miroslav Klose, and American Clint Dempsey as the only players to score at the 2006, 2010 and 2014 FIFA World Cups.

On 18 June, Cahill scored Australia's first goal against the Netherlands in their 3–2 defeat; a strike which has been considered by some experts as one of the best goals ever scored in a World Cup. Cahill's goal was later nominated for the best World Cup goal in the tournament but fell short to the eventual winner James Rodríguez with his goal against Uruguay.

2015 AFC Asian Cup
Cahill was selected under manager Ange Postecoglou as part of his squad which competed in the 2015 AFC Asian Cup. A campaign in which Australia was the host nation with matches hosted across four cities including Canberra, Brisbane, Melbourne and Newcastle, Cahill competed well in what became his nation's inaugural Asian Cup title. He scored three goals in the tournament.

2018 FIFA World Cup and retirement
Cahill was chosen to start against Jordan in a top-of-the-group clash, in which he notched a brace on 29 March 2016. Cahill scored the winning goal for the Socceroos against the United Arab Emirates in a 1–0 away victory. He helped Australia reach the inter-confederation play-offs by scoring two goals, including the winning goal in the second half of extra time (in the 19th minute of extra time) in their 2–1 second leg victory against Syria (3–2 on aggregate). On 15 November 2017, he started in the 3–1 win over Honduras which saw Australia clinch a spot in the 2018 FIFA World Cup.

In May 2018, Cahill was named in the World Cup squad by coach Bert van Marwijk and made a single appearance in the tournament, coming off the bench in the 63rd minute of the 2–0 loss against Peru.

On 16 July 2018, Cahill announced his retirement from international football, subsequently overturned with the decision to participate in one final home friendly against Lebanon in November 2018. He retired with 50 goals (a national team record) in 108 games (the second highest, and just three behind Mark Schwarzer).

Personal life

Cahill became involved with two football academies in 2009, one based in Wollongong, Australia in partnership with Wollongong Police and Community Youth Club, and another in partnership with 'Elite Sporting Academy' in Dubai.

Cahill has featured in EA Sports' FIFA video game series, and has featured as a cover star on several editions of the game.

In 2010 Cahill married his childhood sweetheart Rebekah Greenhill in Las Vegas, en route to Sydney. The couple have four children, Kyah (son, born 2003), Shae (son, born 26 April 2005), Sienna (daughter, born 2007) and Cruz (son, born 2 September 2012). As of 2015, the Cahills owned homes in Sydney, Florida, New York, Shanghai, and England.

Cahill is heavily involved with the UNICEF children's charity.

Cahill's business career is diverse across a range of industries. BRW quoted his net worth to be $28 million in 2014.

Cahill lived in Saddle River, New Jersey while playing for the Red Bulls.

Cahill was officially announced as an ambassador for Australia's Securities Broker ACY Securities on 30 October 2019.

In 2021, Cahill joined the board of directors of K.A.S. Eupen.

In 2022, Cahill was hired as the sporting executive of the FIA-sanctioned international off-road racing series Extreme E team XE Sports Group. XE Sports Group is due to join the 2023 Extreme E season.

Career statistics

Club

International

Honours
In the 2021 Australia Day Honours Cahill was appointed an Officer of the Order of Australia for " distinguished service to football as an elite player at the national and international level, and to charitable and sports organisations ".

In June 2013, the Cahill Expressway in Sydney was temporarily renamed the Tim Cahill Expressway in his honour ahead of the Socceroos' 2014 FIFA World Cup qualification match against Iraq. Football Federation Australia representatives suggested the name change should be made permanently should Cahill score the goal that led to Australia's qualification for the 2014 World Cup.

Millwall
 Football League Second Division: 2000–01
 FA Cup runner-up: 2003–04
 Football League Trophy runner-up: 1998–99

Everton
 FA Cup runner-up: 2008–09

New York Red Bulls
 MLS Supporter's Shield: 2013

Shanghai Shenhua
 Chinese FA Cup runner-up: 2015

Melbourne City
 FFA Cup: 2016
Australia
 AFC Asian Cup: 2015
 OFC Nations Cup: 2004
Individual
 Oceania Footballer of the Year: 2004
 PFA Team of the Year: 2000–01 Second Division, 2003–04 First Division
 AFC Asian Cup Goal of the tournament: 2015
 AFC Asian Cup Team of the tournament: 2015
 A-League Goal of the Year: 2016–17
 AFC Asian Icon: 6 December 2017 
AFC Opta All-time World Cup XI: 2020
 Australian Professional Football Association Player of the Year: 2008–09
 Australia's greatest ever team: 2012
 MLS Player of the Week 2013: Week 9
 MLS Best XI: 2013
 MLS All-Stars: 2014
 Best MLS Player ESPY Award: 2014
FIFA World Cup Man of the Match
 2006: vs Japan (GS)  
 2010: vs Serbia (GS)
 Everton Player of the Season: 2004–05
 Everton Players' Player of the Season: 2004–05
 Everton top goalscorer of the season: 2004–05
 New York Red Bulls Most valuable player: 2013
 New York Red Bulls Goal of the Year: 2013
 New York Red Bulls Golden boot: 2013
 Ballon d’Or: 2006 (Nominee) 
 FIFA Puskás Award nominee: 2014

Achievements
 First Australian to score at the World Cup Finals
 First Australian to score at the Asian Cup Finals
 First Australian to be honoured a FIFA World Cup Man of the match award
 First Australian to score at three FIFA World Cups: 2006, 2010, 2014
 Most Goals by an Australian at the Asian Cup Finals (see List of AFC Asian Cup Goalscorers)
 Australia's oldest ever goalscorer: (37 years and 308 days) goals against Syria in 2017
 First Everton player since Neville Southall in 1988 to be nominated for the Ballon d’Or 
 First Everton player since Dixie Dean in 1931 to score in three separate Merseyside derbies at Anfield
 Has scored more post-war league goals against Liverpool than any other Everton player
 Has the record for scoring the fastest goal in MLS history. On 20 October 2013, Cahill scored within the first 7 seconds of the game against Houston Dynamo

See also
 List of top international men's football goalscorers by country
 List of men's footballers with 100 or more international caps
 List of men's footballers with 50 or more international goals
 List of Australia international soccer players

References

External links

Tim Cahill at the Everton website

Tim Cahill at Football-Lineups.com

1979 births
Living people
AFC Asian Cup-winning players
A-League Men players
Association football forwards
Association football midfielders
Australia international soccer players
Australian expatriate soccer players
Expatriate footballers in China
Expatriate footballers in England
Expatriate footballers in India
Expatriate soccer players in the United States
Australian expatriate sportspeople in China
Australian expatriate sportspeople in England
Australian expatriate sportspeople in India
Australian expatriate sportspeople in the United States
Australian people of Irish descent
Australian sportspeople of Samoan descent
Australian soccer players
Chinese Super League players
Officers of the Order of Australia
Designated Players (MLS)
English Football League players
Everton F.C. players
FIFA Century Club
Footballers at the 2004 Summer Olympics
Indian Super League players
Jamshedpur FC players
Major League Soccer All-Stars
Major League Soccer players
Marquee players (A-League Men)
Melbourne City FC players
Millwall F.C. players
New York Red Bulls players
Olympic soccer players of Australia
People with acquired Samoan citizenship
Premier League players
Samoa under-20 international footballers
Samoan footballers
Samoan people of Irish descent
Shanghai Shenhua F.C. players
Soccer players from Sydney
Sportsmen from New South Wales
Stanley family (rugby)
Zhejiang Professional F.C. players
FA Cup Final players
2004 OFC Nations Cup players
2005 FIFA Confederations Cup players
2006 FIFA World Cup players
2007 AFC Asian Cup players
2010 FIFA World Cup players
2011 AFC Asian Cup players
2014 FIFA World Cup players
2015 AFC Asian Cup players
2017 FIFA Confederations Cup players
2018 FIFA World Cup players